Ceuthophilus elegans is an insect species in the genus Ceuthophilus. It is placed in the cave crickets subfamily (Ceuthophilinae). It is found in the United States.

References

External links 
 
 'Ceuthophilus elegans'' at orthoptera.speciesfile.org

elegans
Orthoptera of North America
Insects described in 1934